Richa Maria Adhia (born 1 May 1988) is a Tanzanian model and beauty pageant contestant who won Miss Earth Tanzania 2006, Miss Tanzania 2007 and Miss India Tanzania 2010. She is the 3rd generation of Indian/ Portuguese descent with family origins from Calangute, Goa who is born and
brought up in Tanzania.

She represented Tanzania in both Miss Earth 2006 in the Philippines and Miss World 2007 in China. So far, she remains the only Tanzanian beauty pageant contestant to have represented her country in both of the International contests. In 2010 she was also chosen to represent Tanzania at Miss India Worldwide pageant.

Early life
Richa Adhia grew up in Mwanza, Tanzania and went to lake English Medium Primary School.
She later moved to the city Dar Es Salaam and went to Shaban Robert Secondary School.
Coming from humble begins, she first began working at the age of 13 and was scouted as a
model at the age of 15 by well renowned fashion designer Mustafa Hassanali. This went on to
become her breakthrough as a famous Indian model who walked the ramp for various designers
nationally and internationally.

At the age of 19, she joined the beauty pageant world and won various pageants before
becoming an entrepreneur and starting a business in beauty, real estate and events
management.

She later founded Richa Adhia’s Foundation (RAF) which worked with the elderly to provide shelter
and free eye treatments supported by IPP Media.

Miss Earth Tanzania 2006
Adhia won Miss Earth Tanzania 2006 and represented Tanzania in Miss Earth 2006 in the Philippines where she was initially counted among the strongest contestants from Africa, after being placed among the Top 15 best swimsuit contestants. However, she was unable to make a cut into the semifinalists in the Final Show.

Miss Tanzania 2007
After completing her reign as Miss Earth Tanzania in 2006, Richa, went ahead to participate in other regional beauty contests and finally won Miss Kinondoni 2007, after which she was able to participate in Miss Tanzania 2007 contest which she eventually also won. There was a controversy over her win due to her race, as she was of Indian origin. However, despite the mixed reactions, she went ahead to participate in Miss World 2007 contest in China the same year and became the first Asian ethnic contestant to represent an East African country in Miss World contest.

Miss India Worldwide 2010
On 6 March 2010, Richa was chosen to represent Tanzania in Miss India Worldwide 2010 contest for the first time, the contest was held in Durban, South Africa where she was placed among the Top Ten contestants and also won a TOP MODEL award.

Acting
In addition to being a model, TV host and an event organizer, Richa has also acted in the following movies/TV shows:

Personal life 
In 2018 she married Haninder Sachdeva, a British hotelier and entrepreneur and settled in the United Kingdom where they run a hotel asset management company called Eight Continents Hotels and Resorts

References

External links
I am proudly Tanzanian – Miss Kinondoni '07

1988 births
Living people
People from Mwanza Region
Tanzanian female models
Tanzanian beauty pageant winners
Miss Earth 2006 contestants
Miss World 2007 delegates
Shaaban Robert Secondary School alumni
Tanzanian people of Indian descent
Tanzanian people of Goan descent
Tanzanian film actresses
Actresses of Indian descent
Female models of Indian descent
Tanzanian expatriates in India
Tanzanian emigrants to the United Kingdom